The Methodist Church may refer to one of a number of denominations of Methodism, some of which included a national description in the title, including:

Extant
 Methodist Church in Brazil
 Methodist Church in the Caribbean and the Americas
 Methodist Church in Chile
 Methodist Church in Cuba
 Methodist Church of Fiji and Rotuma
 Methodist Church Ghana
 Methodist Church of Great Britain
 Methodist Church in India
 Methodist Church in Indonesia
 Methodist Church in Ireland
 Methodist Church in Italy
 Methodist Church in Malaysia
 Methodist Church, Upper Myanmar
 Methodist Church of New Zealand
 Methodist Church in Peru
 Methodist Church in Singapore
 Methodist Church of Southern Africa
 Methodist Church in Sri Lanka

Historical
 Methodist Church of Australasia, became part of the Uniting Church in Australia in 1977
 Methodist Church (Canada), became part of the United Church of Canada in 1925
 Methodist Church (USA), became part of the United Methodist Church in 1969

Historic buildings
 Methodist Church of Alberton, Montana, United States
 Methodist Church (Barnstable, Massachusetts), now Marstons Mills Community Church, listed on the U.S. National Register of Historic Places (NRHP)
 Methodist Church, Great Budworth, England
 Methodist Church of Marshall, Oklahoma, United States
 Methodist Church, Pettah, Sri Lanka
 Methodist Church (Sandy Creek, New York), listed on the NRHP
 Methodist Church, Weaverham, England

See also

 
 
 List of Methodist churches
 List of Methodist denominations
 United Methodist Church (disambiguation)
 First Methodist Church (disambiguation)
 Methodism (disambiguation)